Dusty Glacier is located on northeast slopes of Glacier Peak in the U.S. state of Washington. As is true with all the glaciers found on Glacier Peak, Dusty Glacier is retreating. Dusty Glacier is heavily crevassed and the glacier ends in an ice fall at its terminus.

See also
List of glaciers in the United States

References

Glaciers of Glacier Peak
Glaciers of Washington (state)